Salman Ahmed Al-Ansari is a former football player who represented Qatar internationally, most notably at the Asian Cup qualifying tournament in 2003.

Early life and education
Salman A. Al-Ansari graduated from Qatar University with Bachelor of Laws (LLB) in 2004. While at Qatar University, he was playing at Al-Rayyan Sports Club and the Qatar national football team until 2005 where he had a heart surgery. He appeared for Qatar at the 2002 King's Cup and 2002 West Asian Games.

In 2006, he attended the University of Pennsylvania Law School from which he graduated with Master of Laws (LLM) in 2007. In 2013, Salman attended HEC Paris and was awarded EMBA.

Career
Salman started lecturing at Qatar University College of Law directly after his graduation from University of Pennsylvania Law School for three years. During that time, he was able to introduce the first legal writing program which evolved to be a legal research and writing module then a center under Qatar University College of Law.

After leaving Qatar University, Salman joined Patton Boggs LLP, He joined Al-Ansari & Associates after Patton Boggs.

In addition to his job at Al-Ansari & Associates, Salman is a visiting lecturer at Qatar University College of Law. He spoke in the 1st, 2nd and 3rd Annual International Legal Forum organized by ExxonMobil. In addition to workshops delivered for the Family Supreme Council, Roudha Center and Georgetown University – Qatar Women Society. He published an article regarding restructuring the financial sector in Qatar.

References

External links

1983 births
Living people
Qatari footballers
Qatar international footballers
People from Doha
2000 AFC Asian Cup players
Footballers at the 2002 Asian Games
Qatar Stars League players
Al-Rayyan SC players
Association football goalkeepers
Asian Games competitors for Qatar
University of Pennsylvania Law School alumni